Utopia Parkway is the second studio album by the American rock band Fountains of Wayne. It was released by Atlantic Records in April 1999.

Background
The album was written by Chris Collingwood and Adam Schlesinger with the intention of emulating albums with a strong thematic story inspired by its surroundings, such as Muswell Hillbillies by The Kinks and Born to Run by Bruce Springsteen. According to Schlesinger, "When we were teenagers, we liked listening to Kinks records because we'd never been to England, and we got a sense of what it was like to live there. We really wanted to make a record that felt whole. We intentionally didn't include a few good songs because once we started picking up on the thematic connections, we wanted to stick with it." Collingwood added, "It had to do with reaching a level of maturity where you realize your own life is worth singing about. We spent so much time glamourizing bands like the Kinks, but what they were singing about was just everyday suburbia in England. There's this realization that you don't have to sing about Kensington for it to be worthwhile."

In terms of musical direction, the band opted to evoke songs and bands that had an ubiquitous nature when they were younger. According to Schlesinger, "Musically, the stuff on the record is like picking through all the songs that people our age weren't about to avoid growing up. It could be Loverboy, Steve Miller, the Cars, Journey. You don't even know if you like it or hate it; it just pops into your head. Sometimes when we're arranging a song we all remember something at the same time so we'll throw it in there. It's not even really conscious."

Collingwood's songwriting contributions on this album - including "Troubled Times", "A Fine Day for a Parade" and "Amity Gardens" - tended to be more serious than Schlesinger's. According to Collingwood, "I think I was a little panicky after the first record as being perceived as a novelty band. So I was trying to move away from making jokes on this record. That's why my contributions are more dismal."

This is also the first Fountains of Wayne album to feature guitarist Jody Porter and drummer Brian Young, who joined the band after Collingwood and Schlesinger had finished recording the debut album almost entirely on their own. According to Collingwood, "The new album was definitely recorded more like a band. We had been touring with them for over a year after making the first record, and it felt like second nature when we made the new record and it sounded the way the band sounds. The progression from the first record to the second was so gradual that I didn't really notice until I went back and listened to the first album and realized it really didn't sound like a band."

Cover
The album is named after a major street that connects the neighborhoods of Utopia and Beechhurst in the Queens borough of New York City, and its street sign is featured on the album cover. According to Schlesinger, "The name is so evocative. It ties in all these different places and characters because there's such a sense of longing about it."

Details
Dropped by Atlantic after sales failed to meet expectations, the band had a growing dispute with the company after it put no effort into promoting the album's single "Troubled Times".

Reception

Utopia Parkway was named an "Album of the Week" by People Magazine in 1999 upon its release, but received mixed reviews from music press with some claiming the album showed the band "lacked depth" while others declared it a "masterpiece from the moment you first hear it".

The album contains two fan favorite songs from the Fountains' live performances: "Red Dragon Tattoo," about a boy who gets a tattoo to impress a girl, and "Denise," a faux-grunge power-pop confection where the songwriters show their intentionally bad and comic writing with "She works at Liberty Travel/ She's got a heart made of gravel."  "Troubled Times," originally written by Collingwood when he and Schlesinger were in a previous incarnation of Fountains of Wayne called Pinnwheel, is also a fan favorite.

"Red Dragon Tattoo" was featured prominently throughout the Stephen King mini-series Kingdom Hospital. The 2008 Dar Williams album Promised Land includes a cover of "Troubled Times".

Track listing
All songs written and composed by Chris Collingwood and Adam Schlesinger.
 "Utopia Parkway" – 3:09
 "Red Dragon Tattoo" – 3:32
 "Denise" – 2:32
 "Hat and Feet" – 3:03
 "The Valley of Malls" – 3:23
 "Troubled Times" – 3:39
 "Go, Hippie" – 3:58
 "A Fine Day For a Parade" – 4:13
 "Amity Gardens" – 3:11
 "Laser Show" – 2:24
 "Lost in Space" – 2:19
 "Prom Theme" – 3:09
 "It Must Be Summer" – 3:19
 "The Senator's Daughter" – 3:44
 "I Know You Well" – 3:26 (Japan bonus track)

Personnel
 Chris Collingwood – lead vocals, rhythm guitar
 Adam Schlesinger – bass, keyboards, backing vocals
 Jody Porter – lead guitar, backing vocals
 Brian Young – drums

References

External links

Utopia Parkway at YouTube (streamed copy where licensed)

Fountains of Wayne albums
1999 albums
Atlantic Records albums
Albums produced by Adam Schlesinger